This is a list of Tunisian writers

 Ines Abassi, poet
 Mohamed Bacha (1968– ) linguist. specialist in Tunisian Arabic. translator. short story writer
 Faouzia Aloui (1958– ), poet and short story writer
 Mahmoud Aslan (1902–after 1971)
 Hachemi Baccouche (1916–2008), novelist and essayist
 Hélé Béji (1948– ), novelist and essayist in French
 Tahar Bekri (1951– ), poet in French and Arabic
 Noura Bensaad, novelist and short story writer
 Messaouda Boubaker (1954– ), novelist and short story writer
 Hédi Bouraoui (1932– ), poet, novelist and academic
 Aïcha Chaibi, novelist
 Rachida el-Charni (1967– ), novelist and short story writer
 Brahim Dargouthi (1955– ), novelist and member of steering committee of Union of Tunisian Writers
 'Ali al-Du'aji (1909–1949), novelist
 Aboul-Qacem Echebbi (1909–1934), poet
 Miled Faiza (1974– ), poet and translator
 Mohamed Ghozzi (1949– ), poet and critic
 Sophie el Goulli (1932–2015), novelist and art historian
 Gisèle Halimi (1927–2020), lawyer, feminist activist and essayist
 Faraj Hawwar (1954– ), writer, novelist, and researcher
 Fethia Hechmi (1955– ), novelist, short story writer and poet
 Ibn Khaldoun (1332–1406), polymath
 Bashir Khrayyef (1917–1983), writer and teacher
 Shukri Mabkhout (1962– ), novelist and academic
 Lamia Makaddam (1971– ), poet
 Abdelwahab Meddeb (1946– ), novelist and poet
 Jamila Mejri (1951– ), poet
 Mahmoud Messadi (1911–2004), novelist and playwright
 Albert Memmi (1920–2020), sociologist, novelist and essayist 
 Amel Mokhtar (1964– ), novelist and journalist
 Amel Moussa, poet and journalist
 Hassouna Mosbahi (1950– ), novelist and short story writer
 Moncef Ouahibi (1949– ), poet
 Perpetua (died 203), writer of a prison diary from Carthage, The Passion of Perpetua and Felicity
 Najwa Al-Rayyahi (1962– ) writer and academic
 Kamel Riahi (1974– ), novelist and short story writer
 Youssef Rzouga (1957– ), poet
 Amina Saïd (1953– ), poet
 Habib Selmi (1951– ), novelist and short story writer
 Walid Soliman (1975– ), writer, essayist and translator
 Alia Tabaï, novelist
 Ahmad al-Tifashi (–1253), poet, writer and anthologist
 Mustapha Tlili (1937–2017), novelist and academic
 Mohamed Ali Yousfi, writer and translator
 Z (active as of 2007), anonymous political cartoonist and writer
 Fawzia Zouari, writer and journalist
 Mohamed El Aziz Ben Achour (1951– ), writer, historian, and politician

See also
List of African writers by country

References

Tunisian
Writers